The statue of Albrecht Thaer is a bronze sculpture installed at Schinkelplatz in Berlin, Germany.

References

External links

 

Bronze sculptures in Germany
Statues in Berlin
Outdoor sculptures in Berlin
Sculptures of men in Germany
Statues in Germany
Mitte